Christophe Berthonneau is director, scenographer and producer. He is renowned for his original creations and fireworks at international events. He currently holds the position of president and art director at Groupe F.

Biography 
Christophe Berthonneau was born in 1963 and grew up among artists of all stripes. At the age of 13, he chooses performance art as his life's purpose and subsequently participates in a multitude of artistic adventures, mainly in public spaces. At 18, fascinated by the dramatic power of fire, he embarks on an all-out research of this material. These artistic and technical achievements are now applied in many fields of the entertainment industry.

In 1992, he joins Groupe F and gathers a multidisciplinary team for the creation of « Oiseaux de Feu », the first multiform show of the company,  treating the language of light in all its forms. Since then, he has designed and directed open-air shows around the globe.

Constantly exploring new scenographic, artistic and pyrotechnic territories, he produces contemporary theatre and event performances. His creations are open to all audiences.

Main creations

Main open-air shows 
 Les Oiseaux de Feu (on tour from 1994 to 2000)
 Un peu plus de Lumière (on tour from 1997 to 2010)
 Joueurs de Lumière (on tour from 2004 to 2010)
 Coups de Foudre (on tour from 2008 to 2010)
 Versailles : La Face cachée du Soleil (2007 and 2008)
 L’Autre Monde, Les États et Empires du Soleil (2009)
 Les Noces Royales de Louis XIV (2010)
 Le Roi de Feu (2015, 2016, 2017)
 "Migrations" series (since 2012)
 Rhône, in Arles, for the launch of Marseille Provence, European Capital of Culture 2013
 Focus – La Saga des Photons, for the launch of Dunkirk Regional Capital of Culture 2013
 À Fleur de Peau (on tour since 2014)
 At Pont du Gard : Lux Populi (2008), Impressions (2011), Ludolux (2012), Ulysse au pays des merveilles (2013), Le Magicien d’eau (2014), Les Mondes Magiques (2015), Feux Gaulois (2016), Feux Romains (2017).
 Suspended time, original creation for the 50th anniversary of the Beatles album Sgt. Pepper's Lonely Hearts Club Band at the Sgt Pepper at 50 festival in Liverpool, 2017
 Vives réflexions, inauguration show of Louvre Abu Dhabi, 2017

Main pyrotechnic designs 
 1992 Summer Olympics closing ceremony in Barcelona
 1998 FIFA World Cup Final
 Transition to the year 2000 on the Eiffel Tower
 2004 Summer Olympics opening ceremony, closing ceremony and 2004 Summer Paralympics in Athens
 Inauguration of the Rio–Antirrio Bridge, 2004
 Closing of the Universal Forum of Cultures in Barcelona, 2004
 New Year in London on the London Eye, 2004 to 2009
 2006 Winter Olympics opening ceremony, 2006 Winter Olympics closing ceremony and 2006 Winter Paralympics in Turin
 Inauguration of the Museum of Islamic Art, Doha, 2008
 Opening of the Jeff Koons exhibition at the Palace of Versailles, 2008
 Inauguration of the Burj Khalifa 2010
 Opening and closing of the 2011 AFC Asian Cup in Doha
 Pyrotechnic design for Cai Guo-Qiang's "One Night Stand" at the 2013 Paris Nuit Blanche
 Fireworks on the Eiffel Tower on Bastille Day 2004, 2009, 2014, 2015, 2016, 2018
 Opening and closing ceremonies of the 2016 Summer Olympics and 2016 Summer Paralympics in Rio de Janeiro
 New Year at the Palace of Versailles, 2021

Main multimedia creations 
 150th anniversary of Gaudí at the Sagrada Família 2001
 120th anniversary of the Eiffel Tower 2009
 Bicentenary of Mexico 2010
 « Les Noces Royales de Louis XIV » in Versailles 2010

Works 
Christophe Berthonneau has co-authored two books published by Actes Sud:
 Le Théâtre du Feu, in 2002.
 Feux Royaux à Versailles, in 2008.

Awards 
 Officer in the Order of Arts and Letters, 2011
 « Créateur sans frontière » award granted by Cultures France, 2007
 TEA Award for outstanding achievement for « The Year 2000 Starting Signal » on the Eiffel Tower, 2000
 Recognised by Vanity Fair (1)as one of the 50 most influential Frenchmen, 2015
 Honorary Citizen of Maubeuge and Arles

References

External links 
 (fr+en) Groupe F official website 
  Groupe F LLC (Middle East) official website

 
French directors
Pyrotechnics
French producers
1963 births
Living people